Lamberton's Halt railway station served the townland of Magherabeg in County Donegal, Ireland.

The station opened on 1 June 1928 on the Londonderry and Lough Swilly Railway line from Londonderry Graving Dock to Carndonagh.

It closed for passengers on 6 September 1948.

Routes

References

Disused railway stations in County Donegal
Railway stations opened in 1928
Railway stations closed in 1948
1928 establishments in Ireland
1948 disestablishments in Ireland
Railway stations in the Republic of Ireland opened in the 20th century